Cipuropsis is a genus of flowering plant in the family Bromeliaceae, native to the Caribbean, southern Central America and northwestern South America. The genus was first described by Ule in 1907.

Taxonomy
, different circumscriptions of the genus are in use. In the narrow sense, the segregate genera Josemania and Mezobromelia are recognized; in the broad sense, these are sunk into Cipuropsis. Species accepted by the Encyclopedia of Bromeliads using the narrow sense are:
Cipuropsis amicorum (I.Ramírez & Bevil.) Gouda
Cipuropsis asmussii Gouda
Cipuropsis subandina Ule
Additional species accepted by Plants of the World Online using the broad sense are listed below, together with placements in Josemania and Mezobromelia.
Cipuropsis asplundii (L.B.Sm.) Christenh. & Byng = Josemania asplundii (L.B.Sm.) W.Till & Barfuss
Cipuropsis bicolor (L.B.Sm.) Christenh. & Byng = Mezobromelia bicolor L.B.Sm.
Cipuropsis capituligera (Griseb.) Christenh. & Byng = Mezobromelia capituligera (Griseb.) J.R.Grant
Cipuropsis delicatula (L.B.Sm.) Christenh. & Byng = Josemania delicatula (L.B.Sm.) W.Till & Barfuss
Cipuropsis hospitalis (L.B.Sm.) Christenh. & Byng = Mezobromelia hospitalis (L.B.Sm.) J.R.Grant
Cipuropsis magdalenae (L.B.Sm.) Christenh. & Byng = Mezobromelia magdalenae (L.B.Sm.) J.R.Grant
Cipuropsis pinnata (Mez & Sodiro) Christenh. & Byng = Josemania pinnata (Mez & Sodiro) W.Till & Barfuss
Cipuropsis singularis (Mez & Wercklé) Christenh. & Byng = Josemania singularis (Mez & Wercklé) W.Till & Barfuss
Cipuropsis truncata (L.B.Sm.) Christenh. & Byng = Josemania truncata (L.B.Sm.) W.Till & Barfuss

References

Tillandsioideae